Revenge of the Vampire may refer to:

Black Sunday, a 1960 Italian gothic horror film
 List of Fighting Fantasy gamebooks